Jeannette Aubert (16 June 1920 – 8 October 2004) was a French diver. She competed in the women's 3 metre springboard event at the 1948 Summer Olympics.

References

1920 births
2004 deaths
French female divers
Olympic divers of France
Divers at the 1948 Summer Olympics
Place of birth missing
20th-century French women